Tittakudi (SC) is a state assembly constituency in Tamil Nadu, India newly formed after constituency delimitations 2008. It is included in the Cuddalore parliamentary constituency. Mangalore (SC) legislative assembly change in 2008. It is one of the 234 State Legislative Assembly Constituencies in Tamil Nadu.

Members of Legislative Assembly

Election results

2021

2016

2011

References 

Assembly constituencies of Tamil Nadu